Kobe Maritime Museum is a museum in Kobe, Japan focusing on the history of Japanese shipping and Kobe harbor.

One of the exhibits is the Yamato 1.

See also
Port of Kobe
Meriken Park
Kobe Port Tower

External links
Kobe Maritime Museum

Museums in Kobe
Maritime museums in Japan